Kolina (an acronym of Corriente de Liberación Nacional; lit. "National Liberation Current") is a kirchnerist political party in Argentina founded in 2010 by Alicia Kirchner, sister of former president of Argentina, Néstor Kirchner. The party now forms part of the Frente de Todos, the ruling coalition supporting President Alberto Fernández. At the time of its foundation and until the alliance's dissolution, the party was a member of the Front for Victory.

Following the 2019 general election, the party counts with representation in the Argentine Chamber of Deputies (the National Deputies Lisandro Bormioli, María Rosa Martínez and Paola Vessvessian belong to Kolina). In addition, Alicia Kirchner has been governor of Santa Cruz Province since 2015.

History

Foundation. 
Kolina was created on July 20, 2010, as a current rather than as a party, in order to express a "political space of the national movement" that goes beyond the idea of ​​a party, admitting that it acts as a party. people not affiliated with the party.

Electoral performance

President

Chamber of Deputies

See also
Kolina members
Front for Victory

References

External links
Official website 

Political parties established in 2010
2010 establishments in Argentina
Center-left parties in Argentina
Kirchnerism
Peronist parties and alliances in Argentina